Hermann Molitori, O.P. was a Roman Catholic prelate who served as Auxiliary Bishop of Halberstadt (1471–1483).

Biography
Hermann Molitor was ordained a priest in the Order of Preachers. On 22 November 1471, he was appointed during the papacy of Pope Sixtus IV as Auxiliary Bishop of Halberstadt and Titular Bishop of Salmasa. On 2 February 1472, he was consecrated bishop by Šimun Vosić, Archbishop of Bar, with Antonio de Alcala, Bishop of Ampurias, and Antonio, Bishop of Civita Castellana e Orte, serving as co-consecrators. He served as Auxiliary Bishop of Halberstadt until his death in 1483.

References 

15th-century German Roman Catholic bishops
Bishops appointed by Pope Sixtus IV
Dominican bishops
1483 deaths